Sagkeeng's Finest is an Indigenous Canadian dance troupe that won the first season of Canada's Got Talent in 2012  The trio consists of Brandon Courchene (born 1993 or 1994), Dallas Courchene (born 1995 or 1996), and Vince O'Laney (born 1994), three teenagers from the Sagkeeng First Nation in Manitoba, who perform a blend of traditional Métis jigging with contemporary dance. In their winning performance, the trio danced to a medley of Raghav's "Fire" and Metro Station's "Shake It".

In June 2013, two of the members were arrested by the Royal Canadian Mounted Police for speeding. When the police searched the car, they found 15 grams of cannabis. The police also found brass knuckles. O'Laney was charged with possession of a controlled substance and possession of a prohibited weapon, while Brandon Courchene was charged with possession of a controlled substance. They later apologized to fans in a Facebook post.

References

External links
 
 

21st-century Canadian dancers
First Nations dancers
Ojibwe people
People from Northern Region, Manitoba
First Nations in Manitoba
Artists from Manitoba
Sagkeeng people
Canada's Got Talent winners